Jagland's Cabinet governed Norway between 25 October 1996 and 17 October 1997. It had the following composition:

Cabinet members

References
Thorbjørn Jaglands regjering 1996–1997 – Regjeringen.no

Jagland
Jagland
1996 establishments in Norway
1997 disestablishments in Norway
Cabinets established in 1996
Cabinets disestablished in 1997